Ludlow and Peabody was an American architectural firm with offices in New York City formed by partners Charles S. Peabody and William Orr Ludlow in 1909. The firm continued in practice under that name until 1935.

Peabody graduated from Harvard in 1903, studied architecture at Columbia University, then attended the Ecole des Beaux-Arts, from which he graduated second in his class of 300 in 1908. He became a member of the American Institute of Architects in 1916.

Ludlow earned a degree in mechanical engineering at Stevens Institute of Technology in 1892. He then worked as a draftsman in the office of Carrère and Hastings from 1892 to 1895. He was a member of the firm Ludlow and Valentine until 1909. Ludlow was a member of the American Institute of Architects (AIA) and the New Jersey Society of Architects. Independently or with associates Ludlow was responsible for the design of forty college or university buildings, thirty churches, banks, hospitals, residences, and other buildings, totaling over four hundred commissions in all.

Among the works of Ludlow and Peabody are:

Works

Gallery

References

American architects